Rashed Ahmed Rashed (Arabic:راشد أحمد راشد) (born 18 March 1996) is an Emirati footballer who played in the Pro League for Al Nasr.

References

External links
 

Emirati footballers
1996 births
Living people
Al-Nasr SC (Dubai) players
UAE Pro League players
Association football midfielders